Cerrogordo is an unincorporated community in Holmes County, Florida, United States.

References

Unincorporated communities in Holmes County, Florida
Unincorporated communities in Florida